Kastna Landscape Conservation Area is a nature park situated in Pärnu County, Estonia.

Its area is 123 ha.

The protected area was designated in 2007 to protect coast areas typical to Western Estonia; also theirs biodiversity.

References

Nature reserves in Estonia
Geography of Pärnu County